General transcription factor 3C polypeptide 5 is a protein that in humans is encoded by the GTF3C5 gene.

Model organisms 

Model organisms have been used in the study of GTF3C5 function. A conditional knockout mouse line, called Gtf3c5tm2a(KOMP)Wtsi was generated as part of the International Knockout Mouse Consortium program — a high-throughput mutagenesis project to generate and distribute animal models of disease to interested scientists.

Male and female animals underwent a standardized phenotypic screen to determine the effects of deletion. Twenty four tests were carried out on mutant mice and two significant abnormalities were observed. No homozygous mutant embryos were identified during gestation, and therefore none survived until weaning. The remaining tests were carried out on heterozygous mutant adult mice; no additional significant abnormalities were observed in these animals.

Interactions 

GTF3C5 has been shown to interact with GTF3C2 and GTF3C4.

References

Further reading 

 
 
 
 
 
 
 

Genes mutated in mice